Gruters or the accented Grüters is a surname. Notable people with the surname include:

Gruters
Guy Gruters (born 1942), American Air Force officer and fighter pilot
Joe Gruters (born 1977), American politician and businessman

Grüters
Hugo Grüters (1851–1928), German conductor

See also
Gruter (disambiguation)